Ferrers may refer to:

People
Notable people
Charles Vere Ferrers Townshend, (1861–1924), British army general
Elizabeth Ferrers, (c. 1250 – c. 1300), daughter of William de Ferrers, 5th Earl of Derby
George Ferrers, (1500? – 1579), Member of Parliament for Plymouth in the Parliament of 1542 
Henry de Ferrers, Norman soldier may have taken part in the conquest of England
Norman Macleod Ferrers, (1829–1903), British mathematician
Robert Ferrers (1373–1396), (c. 1373 – bef. 1396), 
Lady Katherine Ferrers, (1634–1660), highwaywoman
several people named Walkelin de Ferrers,
Walchelin de Ferriers, (died 1201), Norman baron and principal captain of Richard I of England
Walkelin de Derby, (c. 1135–1190), Norman lord of Eggington

Noble title
Baron Ferrers of Chartley, English title created on 1299, fell into abeyance in 1855
Baron Ferrers of Groby, title in the Peerage of England created in 1300, forfeit in 1554
see Earl of Derby, title in the Peerage of England, created in 1139
Robert de Ferrers, 1st Earl of Derby,
Robert de Ferrers, 2nd Earl of Derby,
William de Ferrers, 3rd Earl of Derby,
William de Ferrers, 4th Earl of Derby,
William de Ferrers, 5th Earl of Derby,
Robert de Ferrers, 6th Earl of Derby,
Earl Ferrers, title in the Peerage of Great Britain, 1711.

Places etc. in England
Bere Ferrers, Devon, a village 
Bere Ferrers railway station
Churston Ferrers, Devon, an historic parish 
Churston Ferrers Grammar School
Higham Ferrers, Northamptonshire, a town 
Higham Ferrers (UK Parliament constituency)
Higham Ferrers railway station
Newton Ferrers, Devon, a village 
Newton Ferrers, Cornwall, a former manor
South Woodham Ferrers, Essex, a town 
South Woodham Ferrers railway station
Woodham Ferrers, Essex, a village

See also

 
 
 Ferrer (disambiguation)